Elena Yaryshka (born 7 December 1981) is a retired Belarusian tennis player.

In her career, Yaryshka won three singles titles and eight doubles titles on the ITF Circuit. On 21 April 2003, she reached her best singles ranking of world No. 419. On 18 June 2001, she peaked at No. 316 in the doubles rankings.

Playing for Belarus in Fed Cup competition, she has a win–loss record of 0–1.

Yaryshka retired from professional tennis in 2006.

ITF Circuit finals

Singles: 6 (3–3)

Doubles: 13 (8–5)

Fed Cup participation

Doubles

References

External links
 
 
 

1981 births
Living people
Tennis players from Minsk
Belarusian female tennis players
21st-century Belarusian women